Alla Grebennikova (born 24 February 1949) is a retired Russian breaststroke swimmer who won two medals at the 1970 European Aquatics Championships. She also competed at the 1968 Summer Olympics and finished fourth in the 4×100 m medley and 200 m breaststroke events.

She married a Bulgarian swimming coach, Georgi Kostadinov, changed her name to Kostadinova, and moved to Bulgaria. There she worked as a swimming coach and started competing in the masters category. Since around 2000 she returned to Russia (or started sharing time between Russia and Bulgaria) and until 2008 was winning all Russian 200 m breaststroke titles. She finished second at the European (2001) and World championships (2004) in the same event.

References

1949 births
Living people
Swimmers at the 1968 Summer Olympics
Russian female breaststroke swimmers
Soviet female breaststroke swimmers
Olympic swimmers of the Soviet Union
European Aquatics Championships medalists in swimming
Universiade medalists in swimming
Universiade silver medalists for the Soviet Union
Universiade bronze medalists for the Soviet Union
Medalists at the 1970 Summer Universiade